Harry Standjofski (born May 22, 1959) is a Canadian actor as well as a theater director and playwright. He has appeared in films such as Guy X, The Aviator, Protection, X-Men: Days of Future Past and Hidden Agenda and has voiced characters in video games such as Assassin's Creed, Prince of Persia: The Two Thrones, Splinter Cell: Chaos Theory, and Splinter Cell.

His plays Anton and No Cycle can be found in his book Urban Myths published by NuAge Editions. Standjofski has been teaching theatre part-time at Concordia University, where he attended, since 1986.

Filmography

Film roles

 Wild Thing (1987) - Sgt. Matty
 Ford: The Man and the Machine (1987, TV Movie) - Saboteur
 Falling Over Backwards (1990) - Club manager
 Moody Beach (1990) - Douanier
 Love and Human Remains (1993)
 The Neighbor (1993) - Morrie
 Mrs. Parker and the Vicious Circle (1994) - Home Movie Director
 Warriors (1994) - Chandler
 The Wrong Woman (1995) - Dept. Store Security Guard
 The Sleep Room (1998) - Stumpel
 Stardom (2000) - IMDb
 Artificial Lies (2000) - Detective Sgt. Joe Collins
 Café Olé (2000)
 Cause of Death (2001) - Dr. Earl Waxman
 Hidden Agenda (2001) - Kevin
 Protection (2001) - Angelo
 The Aviator (2004) - Crony of Louis B. Mayer
 Guy X (2005) - Chaplain Brank
 A Sentimental Capitalism (2008)
 Barney's Version (2010) - Dr. Morty
 Rose and Violet (2011, Short) - Igor
 The Young and Prodigious T.S. Spivet (2013) - Policeman
 X-Men: Days of Future Past (2014) - Groundskeeper
 Le Militaire (2014) - The barber
 The Walk (2015) - Dock Foreman
 Where Atilla Passes (2015) - Restaurant owner
 Playmobil: The Movie (2019) - Security Guard

Television roles
 Urban Angel (1991) - Lou-Barman
 Are You Afraid of the Dark? (1993-1999) - Phil / Mr. Kristoph
 Big Wolf on Campus (1999) - Soul Sucker

Animation roles
 A Bunch of Munsch (1991-1992)
 Young Robin Hood (1991-1992) - Brother Tuck
 The Country Mouse and the City Mouse Adventures (1997-1998)
 Ripley's Believe It or Not! (1999)
 Mumble Bumble (1999) - Narrator
 Rotten Ralph (1999-2001) - Naughty Nathan
 Arthur's Perfect Christmas (2000, TV Movie) - Uncle Fred
 Pig City (2002) - V.P. Larden
 The Lost World (2003) - (English version)
 The Tofus (2004-2007) - Tidus Hubbub
 Tripping the Rift (2004-2007)
 Tupu (2005)
 Winx Club (2005-2007) - Darkar / Avalon
 Yakari (2005-2014)
 Dragon Hunters (2006) - Lian-Chu
 The Girl Who Hated Books (2006) - Aardvark
 Gofrette (2007)
 Supernatural: The Animation (2011) - Bobby Singer (English version)
 Pinocchio (2012) - The Crow / The Green Fisherman (English version)
 The Legend of Sarila (2013) - Uliak

Video Game roles
Jagged Alliance 2 (1999)
Wizardry 8 (2001)
Evolution Worlds (2002) - Cortez / Edmund / Society Clerk
Rainbow Six: Vegas 2 (2004) - Six
Still Life (2005) - Vaclav Kolar / Otokar Kubina
Prince of Persia: The Two Thrones (2005) - The Vizier / Zurvan
Assassin's Creed (2007) - William of Montferrat
Assassin's Creed II (2009) - Silvio Barbarigo Il Rosso
Assassin's Creed: Brotherhood (2010) - Juan Borgia the Elder
Assassin's Creed: Ascendance (2010) - Juan Borgia / Oliverotto da Fermo
Deus Ex: Human Revolution (2011) - Lazarus / Grayson
Assassin's Creed Rogue (2014) - Lawrence Washington
Assassin's Creed Unity (2014) - Honoré Gabriel Riqueti, comte de Mirabeau
Deus Ex: Mankind Divided (2016) - Lazarus

References

External links

1959 births
Living people
Canadian people of Polish descent
Canadian male film actors
Canadian male voice actors
20th-century Canadian dramatists and playwrights
21st-century Canadian dramatists and playwrights
Male actors from Montreal
People from Pierrefonds-Roxboro
Canadian male dramatists and playwrights
20th-century Canadian male writers
21st-century Canadian male writers